Yukarıyenice can refer to:

 Yukarıyenice, Dazkırı
 Yukarıyenice, Palandöken